Werauhia balanophora is a bromeliad species in the genus Werauhia. This species is endemic to Costa Rica.

References

balanophora
Flora of Costa Rica